Kayser-Roth Corporation (a subsidiary of ) is an underwear and hosiery manufacturer based in Greensboro, North Carolina. The company currently markets three owned brands in North America, No Nonsense, Hue and Burlington.

History
Julius Kayser & Co., the predecessor to the modern Kayser-Roth Corporation, was founded in the early 20th century by Julius Kayser and was a manufacturer of hosiery, lingerie and gloves. In 1958, the company purchased the Chester H. Roth Company, forming Kayser-Roth. Alfred P. Slaner, the first head of the merged company, developed Supp-Hose hosiery.

In 1968, a merger with Penn Central Transportation Company was explored, however terms could not be agreed.

In 1973, in order to compete with the L'eggs brand (currently owned by HanesBrands), Kayser-Roth launched No Nonsense, which was one of the first brands of hosiery to be sold in supermarkets, drugstores and discount department stores. In 1975 Kayser-Roth was purchased by conglomerate Gulf+Western.

In the years under Gulf+Western's ownership, improvements were made to Canadian manufacturing plants, most notably in Ontario and Quebec. Forays into diverse markets such as the automotive industry were carried out.  During the late-1970s and early-1980s almost every GM automobile produced had Kayser-Roth components on board.

In 1985 Gulf+Western began divesting all of its non-entertainment enterprises, with Kayser-Roth being sold to the Wickes Companies. In 1993, the Mexican hosiery manufacturer Grupo Synkro purchased the company for approximately $230 million.

In 1999, Italian Golden Lady, the largest hosiery manufacturer in Europe, acquired Kayser-Roth Corporation from Grupo Synkro and reorganized the company. During the 2000s, the No Nonsense brand expanded to include bras, panties, sleepwear, socks for women and men, and foot comfort products.

In April 2011, Kayser-Roth partnered to become an exclusive distributor of socks and hosiery for Jockey International.

Today, Kayser-Roth products are featured on the television show Gossip Girl (2007-2012) and have also previously been showcased on The View (1997-).

References

External links
Kayser-Roth

American companies established in 1958
Clothing companies of the United States
Hosiery brands
Lingerie brands
Underwear brands
Companies based in Greensboro, North Carolina
Clothing companies established in 1958
1958 establishments in North Carolina
Gulf and Western Industries
1975 mergers and acquisitions
1985 mergers and acquisitions
1993 mergers and acquisitions
1999 mergers and acquisitions